Lindy Hansen (born 15 April 1969 in Sarpsborg) is a Norwegian sport shooter. She competed in rifle shooting events at the Summer Olympics in 1992, 1996, and 2000.

Olympic results

References

1969 births
Living people
People from Sarpsborg
ISSF rifle shooters
Norwegian female sport shooters
Olympic shooters of Norway
Shooters at the 1992 Summer Olympics
Shooters at the 1996 Summer Olympics
Shooters at the 2000 Summer Olympics
Sportspeople from Viken (county)
20th-century Norwegian women